Scott Seamer is an Australian former professional rugby league footballer who played for the Newcastle Knights in 1988.

External links
http://www.rugbyleagueproject.org/players/Scott_Seamer/summary.html

Living people
Australian rugby league players
Newcastle Knights players
Year of birth missing (living people)
Place of birth missing (living people)